the Judo competitions at the 2019 Games of the Small States of Europe were held at the Sport Center Cetinje, Cetinje on 28 and 30 May 2019.

Medal table

Medalists

Men

Women

References

External links
 
 Results
 Team results 
 

European Games, Small States
2019 Games of the Small States of Europe
2019
Judo competitions in Montenegro
Cetinje